The 1981 Major League Baseball season culminated with the Los Angeles Dodgers defeating the New York Yankees in the World Series, capturing the franchise's fifth World Series title. The season had a players' strike, which lasted from June 12 to July 31, and split the season into two halves. Teams that won their division in each half of the season advanced to the playoffs.

The All-Star Game was originally scheduled for July 14, but was canceled due to the strike. It was ultimately played on August 9, as a prelude to the second half of the season, which began the following day.

Standings

American League

National League

Postseason

Bracket

NOTE: Due to a strike in mid-season, the season was divided into a first half and a second half. The division winner of the first half (denoted E1, W1) played the division winner of the second half (denoted E2, W2).

Statistical leaders

Awards and honors
Baseball Hall of Fame
Rube Foster
Bob Gibson
Johnny Mize

Other awards
Outstanding Designated Hitter Award: Greg Luzinski (CWS)
Roberto Clemente Award (Humanitarian): Steve Garvey (LAD)
Rolaids Relief Man Award: Rollie Fingers (MIL, American); Bruce Sutter (STL, National).

Player of the Month

Pitcher of the Month

Home field attendance

Television coverage

Events

January–March
January 15 – In his first year of eligibility, former St. Louis Cardinals pitcher Bob Gibson is the only person elected to the Hall of Fame by the Baseball Writers' Association of America. Players falling short of the 301 votes needed for election include Don Drysdale (243), Gil Hodges (241), Harmon Killebrew (239), Hoyt Wilhelm (238) and Juan Marichal (233).
January 23 – Fred Lynn  was traded by the Boston Red Sox with Steve Renko to the California Angels for Frank Tanana, Jim Dorsey, and Joe Rudi.
February 12 – Reputedly because the Boston Red Sox mailed out his contract two days late, catcher Carlton Fisk is declared a free agent.  He will later sign with the Chicago White Sox.
March 11 – Johnny Mize and Rube Foster are elected to the Hall of Fame by the Special Veterans Committee. Mize hit .312 with 359 home runs in 15 seasons for the Cardinals and New York Giants, while Foster was a star pitcher, manager and  pioneer of the Negro leagues during the first quarter of the 20th century.

April–June
April 9 – After pitcher Jerry Reuss pulls a muscle, rookie Fernando Valenzuela is given his first starting assignment.  His first Major League start results in a five-hit shutout.  It is the beginning of what will be called "Fernandomania" in Southern California.
April 10 – Carlton Fisk debuts with the Chicago White Sox, coincidentally in Fenway Park against his former team, the Boston Red Sox.  Fisk hits a three-run home run in the eighth to secure a 5–3 win for Chicago.
April 18 – Tom Seaver of the Cincinnati Reds records his 3000th career strikeout.  Keith Hernandez is the victim.
April 18 – 19 – Minor league teams from Pawtucket and Rochester clash in a 33 inning game that extends eight hours and 25 minutes;  the longest professional baseball game up to that time.  Future Hall of Famers Wade Boggs and Cal Ripken Jr. go a combined 6-for-25 in the game.
April 27 – Just 18 days after his first start, Fernando Valenzuela has grabbed the attention of the baseball world.  In just his fifth start, he pitches his fourth complete game shutout running his record to 5–0 with a microscopic 0.20 ERA.  He is also batting over .400 to help his own cause.
April 29 – Steve Carlton of the Philadelphia Phillies records his 3000th career strikeout. April 1981 is the only month in history to have two pitchers reach this milestone.  He is the first left-handed pitcher in Major League history to reach that mark.
May 10 – In the second game of a doubleheader, Charlie Lea of the Montreal Expos no-hits the San Francisco Giants 4–0, the first no-hitter ever pitched at Olympic Stadium.
May 15 – Len Barker of the Cleveland Indians pitches a perfect game against the Toronto Blue Jays, 3–0, at Cleveland Municipal Stadium. He struck out 11, all swinging, after the third inning and never had a 3-ball count on any batter on a misty, rain-soaked night where only 7,290 fans took in the game. Current Indians broadcaster Rick Manning caught the 27th out of the night on a fly ball to center field.  Barker's catcher, Ron Hassey will later catch Dennis Martínez's 1991 perfect game making him the first catcher in history to catch two perfect games.
May 25 – Carl Yastrzemski plays in his 3,000th major league game, scoring the winning run in Boston's 8–7 triumph over Cleveland. Yaz joins Ty Cobb, Stan Musial and Hank Aaron as the fourth major leaguer to appear in 3,000 games.
May 28 – After Kansas City Royals player Amos Otis hits a grounder along the third-base line at the Seattle Kingdome, Mariners player Lenny Randle gets down onto his hands and knees and blows on the ball, in an attempt to make it a foul ball.
June 5 – Nolan Ryan issues the 1,777th walk in his career, breaking the record previously held by Early Wynn.
June 10 – Pete Rose hits a Nolan Ryan pitch for the 3,630th safe hit of his career; tying Stan Musial's National League record for career hits.
June 12 – After meeting with major league owners for most of the previous day, players' union chief Marvin Miller announces, "We have accomplished nothing. The strike is on", thus beginning the longest labor action to date in baseball history. By the time the season resumes on August 10, 706 games (38 percent of the season schedule) will have been canceled.
June 16 – In the midst of the players' strike, William Wrigley III announces the sale of the Chicago Cubs to the Tribune Company for $20 million.  This ends the decades long association between the Wrigley family and the Cubs.

July–September
August 6 – As a result of the nearly two-month interruption in play because of the strike, major league owners elect to split the 1981 season into two halves, with the first-place teams from each half in each division (or a division's runner-up team in the second half, if the same club were to win both halves (The Sporting News Official Baseball Guide for 1982, p. 13) meeting in a best-of-five divisional playoff series. The last time the major leagues had played a split season was 1892. The Oakland Athletics, New York Yankees, Philadelphia Phillies and Los Angeles Dodgers suddenly find themselves guaranteed playoff spots as first-half champions (a problem noted at this time is that those teams will not have much left to play for in that year's regular season).
August 9 – At Cleveland Stadium, the National League wins its tenth consecutive All-Star Game over the American League, 5–4. Gary Carter hits two home runs and is selected the MVP. The 1981 Midsummer Classic becomes the first and, as of 2020, the only All-Star Game ever played on a Sunday, and the second ever played during the month of August, the first having taken place on August 3, 1959.
September 4 – In the conclusion of the longest game in Fenway Park history, the Seattle Mariners beat the Boston Red Sox 8–7 in 20 innings. The game began on September 3, but was suspended after 19 innings with the score tied 7–7.
September 6 – Despite having won the first-half American League East title, New York Yankees manager Gene Michael is replaced by Bob Lemon, who managed the club in 1978–79. The Yankees are under .500 in the second half of the season.
September 6 – The Los Angeles Dodgers' Fernando Valenzuela beats the St. Louis Cardinals 5–0 to tie the National League record of seven shutouts by a rookie pitcher.
September 26 – Nolan Ryan of the Houston Astros breaks the record of four no hitters by pitcher Sandy Koufax by pitching his fifth career no hitter in the Astrodome against, coincidentally, Koufax's former team, the Los Angeles Dodgers.
September 30 – The Kansas City Royals defeat the Minnesota Twins, 5–2, to clinch the second half of the American League Western Division title.  More importantly, it is the last Major League game to be played at Metropolitan Stadium, as the Twins prepare to move into the new Hubert H. Humphrey Metrodome.

October–December
October 3 – Bob Horner hits two home runs and scores the winning run to give the Atlanta Braves a 4–3 win over the Cincinnati Reds, and the Houston Astros the second-half title in the NL West division. Cincinnati, which lost the first-half title to the Dodgers by half a game, will finish with the best overall record (66–42) in the major leagues, but will miss the playoffs as a result of not having won either half's division title.
October 3 – The Milwaukee Brewers (playing since 1970) and Montreal Expos (since 1969) clinch their first postseason appearances. Milwaukee beats Detroit 2–1 to wrap up the second-half title in the AL East division, while Montréal edges the Mets 5–4 to win the NL East's second playoff spot. (St. Louis finishes with the best overall record in the NL East but misses the playoffs for the same reason as the Cincinnati Reds.)
October 5 – The Kansas City Royals shut out Cleveland 9–0 in the first game of a scheduled doubleheader to clinch the second-half title in the AL West. The second game is canceled as irrelevant. This was a make-up game after the scheduled season ended the day before.
October 19 – Rick Monday of the Los Angeles Dodgers hits a ninth-inning home run to break a 1–1 tie and secure a Game 5 victory in the National League Championship Series.  The losing Montréal Expos had been leading the series two games to one in what would be their only postseason appearance.
October 28 – Pedro Guerrero drives in five runs, and pitcher Burt Hooton and the Los Angeles Dodgers beat the New York Yankees 9–2 to win the 1981 World Series in six games. In a remarkable postseason, the Dodgers rallied from game deficits of 2–0 against the Astros in the division series, 2-1 against the Expos in the National League Championship series, and 2–0 against the Yankees in the World Series. Guerrero, Ron Cey and Steve Yeager are named co-MVPs.
November 11 – Fernando Valenzuela of the Los Angeles Dodgers wins the National League Cy Young Award, becoming the first rookie to win the award.
November 25 – Rollie Fingers of the Milwaukee Brewers becomes the first relief pitcher ever to win the American League MVP Award, edging Rickey Henderson of the Oakland Athletics, 319 to 308. Fingers saved 28 games while posting a 1.04 ERA.
December 2 – Following the strike-shortened season, Los Angeles Dodgers pitcher Fernando Valenzuela becomes the third consecutive Dodgers player to be named National League Rookie of the Year. The Mexican lefthander posted a 13–7 record with a 2.48 ERA and led the NL in strikeouts (180), games started (25), complete games (11), shutouts (eight) and innings pitched (192). His 13 wins tied him with Steve Carlton in second place behind Tom Seaver, who finished with 14. Valenzuela also made his first All-Star appearance and received both the Cy Young and TSN Rookie of the Year awards.

Deaths
January 26 – Ray Oyler, 42, shortstop known for excellent glovework with the Detroit Tigers' 1968 champions, afterwards taken in the expansion draft by the Seattle Pilots
February 2 – Al Van Camp, 77, first baseman/left fielder who played from 1928 to 1932 for the Cleveland Indians and Boston Red Sox
February 4 – Grant Gillis, 70,  utility infielder for the Washington Senators and Boston Red Sox between 1927 and 1929
February 15 – Cotton Pippen, 69, pitcher for the St. Louis Cardinals, Philadelphia Athletics and Detroit Tigers from 1936 to 1940, better known as the pitcher that struck out Ted Williams in his first major league at-bat
March 7 – Pee-Wee Wanninger, 78, backup shortstop for the Yankees, Red Sox and Reds, better known as the player who replaced Everett Scott with the Yankees in 1925 to end his then major league record of 1,307 consecutive games
March 10 – Bob Elson, 76, broadcaster for the Chicago White Sox from 1931 to 1970; also worked with the Cubs and Oakland Athletics
March 17 – Paul Dean, 67, pitcher who joined his older brother Dizzy on the St. Louis Cardinals, winning 19 games in each of his first two seasons; the brothers each won two games in the 1934 World Series
March 19 – Frank Lane, 85, general manager of the White Sox, Indians, Brewers and Cardinals known for his numerous trades
March 25 – Red Morgan, 97, third baseman for the 1906 Boston Americans, at the time of his death the oldest living former major leaguer
April 16 – Effa Manley, 84, owner of the Negro leagues' Newark Eagles from 1935 to 1948
April 27 – Emerson Dickman, 66, pitcher for the Boston Red Sox between 1936 and 1941, who later became a coach at Princeton University in the 1950s
May 26 – George Smith, 79, pitcher who played from 1926 to 1930 for the Detroit Tigers and Boston Red Sox
July 1 – Dan Daniel, 91, sportswriter for The Sporting News and various New York newspapers for over 50 years; also a member of baseball's Rules Committee
July 8 – Merl Combs, 61, shortstop for the Boston Red Sox, Washington Senators and Cleveland Indians between 1947 and 1952
August 9 – Sammy T. Hughes, 70, 6-time All-Star second baseman of the Negro leagues, mainly with the Elite Giants
October 4 – Freddie Lindstrom, 75, Hall of Fame third baseman for the New York Giants who batted .311 lifetime, twice collecting 230 hits and batting .333 in the 1924 World Series at age 18; later coach at Northwestern
October 17 – Johnny Peacock, 71, catcher for the Boston Red Sox, Philadelphia Blue Jays/Phillies and Brooklyn Dodgers, between 1937 and 1945
October 22 – Taffy Wright, 70, outfielder for the Washington Senators, Chicago White Sox and Philadelphia Athletics from 1938 to 1949
October 25 – Pete Reiser, 62, All-Star center fielder for the Brooklyn Dodgers who led the NL in batting and four other categories in 1941 and in steals twice, but whose fearless defensive style led to numerous injuries
December 10 – John F. Kieran, 89, New York sportswriter and radio and television personality who authored books on numerous subjects
December 22 – Ed Gallagher, 71, pitcher for the 1932 Boston Red Sox
December 28 – John Bischoff, 87, catcher for the Chicago White Sox and Boston Red Sox in the 1920s, and one of the first foreign ballplayers to play in Cuban baseball

References

External links
1981 Major League Baseball season schedule at Baseball Reference
1981 MLB Standings at Baseball Reference

 
Major League Baseball seasons